Muscari neglectum is a perennial bulbous flowering plant in the asparagus family Asparagaceae. Members of this genus are commonly known as grape hyacinths,  and M. neglectum is known as common grape hyacinth or starch grape hyacinth. Muscari are perennial bulbous plants native to Eurasia. They produce spikes of dense, commonly blue, urn-shaped flowers. It is sometimes grown as an ornamental plant, for example, in temperate climates as a spring bulb.

Description 
Muscari neglectum is a herbaceous plant growing from a bulb. The flower stems are 5–20 cm tall. The flowers are arranged in a spike or raceme and are dark blue with white lobes at their tips (teeth); there may be a cluster of paler sterile flowers at the top of the spike. The raceme is 2–6 cm long. The fruit is a 3-celled capsule with two ovules in each cell.

It is a very well known species in cultivation (being described as the "common" grape hyacinth by Brian Mathew); it increases rapidly and can become invasive.

Taxonomy
The name was attributed to Giovanni Gussone by Michele Tenore in a list of plants of  the Neapolitan area published in 1842. The species has a confused nomenclatural history; no fewer than 46 full species names are listed as synonyms in the Kew World Checklist of Selected Plant Families. The name M. racemosum is commonly found as a synonym for M. neglectum in the horticultural literature, although the true M. racemosum Mill. is a different species.

References

External links

 

neglectum
Plants described in 1842
Flora of Lebanon